Kabirmys qarunensis is an extinct species of anomaluroid (scaly-tailed flying squirrel) rodent from the earliest late Eocene of the Birket Qarun Formation from northern Egypt. So far, it was monotypic in its genus. It was described in September 2010 by Hesham Sallam, Erik Seiffert, Elwyn Simons, and Chlöe Brindley based on isolated teeth, partial mandibles, and an edentulous partial maxilla. It is noteworthy for being the largest known Eocene anomaluroid.

References

Anomalures
Eocene rodents
Eocene mammals of Africa
Fossil taxa described in 2010